John Leslie "Jack" Miller (September 16, 1925 – April 15, 2004) was a Canadian professional ice hockey winger who played 17 games in the National Hockey League. Miller was a member of the Chicago Black Hawks. He was born in Delisle, Saskatchewan.

External links

1925 births
2004 deaths
Canadian ice hockey left wingers
Chicago Blackhawks players
Ice hockey people from Saskatchewan